Johnathan Smith (born 13 September 1944) is a Welsh former professional footballer who played as a defender. He made appearances in the English Football League with Wrexham. He also played for Caernarfon Town in the Welsh League.

References

1944 births
Living people
English footballers
Association football defenders
Burnley F.C. players
Wrexham A.F.C. players
Caernarfon Town F.C. players
English Football League players